The Clown Barber is an 1898 British short black-and-white silent film directed and produced by the Scottish film pioneer James Williamson.

The film was produced in Brighton and Hove. The actual film is 21.34 m long.

References

External links 
 

1898 films
1890s British films
British black-and-white films
British silent short films
Films directed by James Williamson (film pioneer)
1898 comedy films
British comedy short films
1898 short films
Films shot in East Sussex
Silent comedy films